Masaki is a Japanese given name. Notable people with the name include:

 Masaki Aiba (born 1982), Japanese actor and musician
 Masaki Chugo (born 1982), Japanese footballer
 Masaki Doi (born 1960), Japanese politician
, Japanese pole vaulter
, Japanese sport wrestler
 Masaki Fujihata (born 1956), Japanese artist
 Masaki Fukai (born 1980), Japanese footballer
 Masaki Hemmi (born 1986), Japanese footballer
 Masaki Hoshino (born 1967), Japanese Go player
 Masaki Iida (born 1985), Japanese footballer
 Masaki Inoue (born 1979), Japanese Olympic cyclist
, Japanese trampolinist
, Japanese curler
 Masaki Izumi (born 1961), Japanese shogi player
 Masaki Kaji (born 1988), Japanese actor and singer
 Masaki Kajishima (born 1962), Japanese anime artist
 Masaki Kaneko (swimmer) (born 1992), Japanese Olympic swimmer
 Masaki Kano (born 1976), Japanese racing driver
 Masaki Kashiwara (born 1947), Japanese mathematician
 Masaki Kinoshita (born 1989), Japanese footballer
 Masaki Kito (born 1960), Japanese attorney
 Masaki Kobayashi (1916–1996), Japanese film director
 Masaki Kyomoto (born 1959), Japanese singer-songwriter and actor
 Masaki Liu, American music producer
 Masaki Minami (born 1989), Japanese baseball player
 Masaki Miyasaka (born 1989), Japanese footballer
 Masaki Morinaga (born 1972), Japanese athlete
 Masaki Nakao (born 1996), Japanese entertainer
 Masaki Nashimoto (born 1993), Japanese sprinter
 Masaki Nishizawa (born 1972), Japanese mixed martial artist
 Masaki Ogata (born 1964), Japanese Go player
 Masaki Ogawa (born 1975), Japanese footballer and manager
 Masaki Okada (born 1989), Japanese actor
 Masaki Okimoto (born 1982), Japanese professional wrestler
 Masaki Okino (born 1996), Japanese footballer
 , Japanese volleyball player
 Masaki Saito (baseball) (born 1965), Japanese baseball player
 Masaki Saito (footballer) (born 1980), Japanese footballer
 Masaki Sakamoto (born 1996), Japanese footballer
 Masaki Sato (born 1999), Japanese singer
, Japanese snowboarder
 Masaki Shibata (born 1953), Japanese Olympic handball player
 Masaki Suda (born 1993), Japanese actor
 Masaki Sumitani (born 1975), Japanese comedian and professional wrestler
, Japanese speed skater
 Masaki Takemiya (born 1951), Japanese Go player
 Masaki Tamura (born 1939), Japanese cinematographer
 Masaki Tanaka (born 1991), Japanese footballer
 Masaki Terasoma (born 1962), Japanese voice actor
 Masaki Tokudome (born 1971), Japanese motorcycle racer
 Masaki Toshimitsu Dannoshin (1690–1776), Japanese swordsman
 Masaki Toshiro (born 1980), Japanese Olympic luger
 Masaki Tsuchihashi (born 1972), Japanese footballer
 Masaki Tsuji (born 1932), Japanese scenario writer
 Masaki Tsukano (born 1970), Japanese footballer
, Japanese footballer
 Masaki Watanabe (1911–1995), Japanese surgeon
 Masaki Watanabe (footballer) (born 1986), Japanese footballer
 Masaki Yamada (writer) (born 1950), Japanese science fiction author
 Masaki Yamada (musician) (born 1964), Japanese singer-songwriter
, Japanese footballer
Masaki Yamamoto (cyclist) (born 1996), Japanese cyclist
 Masaki Yanagawa (born 1987), Japanese footballer
 Masaki Yokotani (born 1952), Japanese footballer
 Masaki Yoshida (born 1984), Japanese footballer
 Yoshinohana Masaki (born 1943), Japanese sumo wrestler

Fictional characters
 Masaki Michishita, a character in the manga Kuso Miso Technique
 Sasami Masaki Jurai, a character in the anime and manga series Tenchi Muyo!
 Masaki Takigawa (日本語：滝川雅貴), a character in the light novel series and anime Tsurune

See also
 Masaki (disambiguation)
 Masaki (surname)
 Masaaki

Japanese unisex given names